Qamil Balla (born 10 August 1989) is an Australian professional boxer. As an amateur, he competed at the 2010 Commonwealth Games.

Family background 
Qamil Balla was born in Werribee to an Albanian family that immigrated from Albania to Australia prior to his birth. Certain members of his family are boxers. His father Nuri was a Victorian champion while his uncle Mitat (also his former coach) was an Australian champion. His younger brother Ibrahim has also won Australian titles and represented Australia at the 2012 Summer Olympics in the bantamweight division.

Qamil starting boxing as a youngster alongside his brother Ibrahim and, by the age of 12, both were competing in – and winning – junior tournaments.

Amateur career 
As an amateur Balla competed in 70 bouts, with 62 wins. He won multiple Victorian and Australian titles, represented Australia internationally and finished top 30 in the world.

Balla was runner up in selection for the 2012 Summer Olympics in the light welterweight division but missed out to current WBO welterweight champion Jeff Horn with Gealan Toulea finishing in third position. Qamil had beaten Horn early in his amateur career in Port Adelaide at the selection trials for the 2009 World Championships but lost in a rematch at the Arafura Games and then in the 64 kg category at the 2012 Olympic trials.

Professional career

Victoria State super lightweight champion 
Qamil won his first professional title on 25 July 2013 against Nawakon Kitee of Thailand at The Melbourne Pavilion Flemington, Qamil being declared the winner by UD.

Australian super lightweight champion 
On 12 September 2013 Qamil won his second professional title in his first 10 round bout against the tough Australian boxer Jack Brubaker at The Melbourne Pavilion Flemington. Qamil won by unanimous points decision with the judges cards reading 96-94, 98-92 and 97-93.

On 25 June 2014 Qamil had his first title defence against fellow Melburnian and former Victorian Lightweight Champion Terry Tzouramanis. Qamil won the fight by unanimous points decision with the judge's cards reading 97-91, 98-90 and 99-89. Tzouramanis went down in round 3 and was deducted 1 pt in round 8 for excessive holding.

Interim WBA Oceania lightweight champion 
Qamil won his third professional title on 18 March 2017 against experienced Colombian Rodolfo Puente. Referee Ignatius Missailidis stopped the fight at 2:29 in the first round following the second knockdown, Qamil declared the winner by TKO.

Balla Vs Kambosos 
On 6 May 2017 Qamil experienced his first professional defeat against George Kambosos Jr. The bout was billed as the semi main event to the Joseph Parker Vs Razvan Cojanu, WBO World Heavyweight Title fight at New Zealand's Vodafone Events Centre, Manukau City.

The two Australians put on the fight of the night with Kambosos taking control early and winning by unanimous points decision.

WBA Oceania super lightweight champion 
On 4 May 2019 Qamil started the year off with a solid TKO victory over experienced Indonesian Hero Tito for the vacant WBA Oceania Super lightweight title. The win was an impressive victory for Qamil after spending 14 months away from the ring due to a knuckle injury.

Professional boxing record

References

External links
 

1989 births
Living people
Sportsmen from Victoria (Australia)
Australian male boxers
Australian people of Albanian descent
Light-welterweight boxers
Boxers at the 2010 Commonwealth Games
Commonwealth Games competitors for Australia
Boxers from Melbourne
People from Werribee, Victoria